Garoth is a town in Madhya Pradesh state in central India. It is one of the tehsil of Mandsaur District.It shares boundary with Jhalawar district of Rajasthan.The local Language or dialect spoken here is a mixture of Mewari, Harauti and Malwi Languages.Latitude and longitude coordinates are: 24.328077, 75.649902.

Garoth is a small town situated near Gandhi Sagar Lake, in northern Madhya Pradesh, India. The town is famous with its beautiful setting, great views, and very friendly opened people. The town is an agricultural spot, as well as a small educational center, where a high school and a college can be found.

Demographics
The town has an area of 9,791 km2. The district is bounded by Neemuch District to the north, Rajasthan state to the east and west and It is part of Ujjain Division

Garoth forms the northern projection of Madhya Pradesh from its western Division, i.e., Ujjain Commissioner's Division

As of the 2011 Census of India, Garoth had a population of 1,89,729. Males constitute 51% of the population and females 49%. Garoth has an average literacy rate of 63%, higher than the national average of 59.5%: male literacy is 76%, and female literacy is 50%. In Garoth, 15% of the population is under 6 years of age.

Gandhi Sagar dam

Gandhisagar Dam is situated at a distance of 42  km. from the city headquarter. The Dam is constructed on the Chambal River.

Transport

References

Cities and towns in Mandsaur district